Kengen may refer to:

E. T. Kengen, Colonel in the Royal Netherlands Army during World War II and a senior member of the short lived American-British-Dutch-Australian Command. In 1945 he was Commander of the Royal Netherlands East Indies Army Air Force
Kengen, Ghana,  originally called Kenrene is a town in Jomoro District of Nzima West Constituency of the Western Region of Ghana 
Kengen, a Japanese era name, spanning the years from 1302 through 1303, it comes after Shōan and before Kagen.
Kenya Electricity Generating Company, that is usually shortened to "KenGen". It is the largest power producing company in Kenya producing about 80% of the electricity consumed in the country.